Collective Soul are an American rock band originally formed in Stockbridge, Georgia, and now based in Atlanta. They have released nine studio albums.

Songs

Unreleased

In a November 2015 interview, Will Turpin revealed that about "three or four" songs would go unreleased per album.

See also
Collective Soul discography

References

External links
Collective Soul songs at Allmusic

 
Collective Soul